Prestwich is a town in the Metropolitan Borough of Bury, Greater Manchester, England, and includes the village of Simister and the surrounding countryside.  It is unparished, and contains 48 listed buildings that are recorded in the National Heritage List for England.  Of these, one is listed at Grade I, the highest of the three grades, one is at Grade II*, the middle grade, and the others are at Grade II, the lowest grade.  The town is largely residential, and its most important building is St Mary's Church.  The church and numerous associated structures, particularly tombs and monuments in the churchyard, are listed.  The other listed buildings include houses and associated structures, other churches, a public house, structures associated with the Thirlmere to Manchester water supply, a boundary stone, and two war memorials.


Key

Buildings

Notes and references

Notes

Citations

Sources

Lists of listed buildings in Greater Manchester
Buildings and structures in the Metropolitan Borough of Bury
Listed